The 2016–17 Ole Miss Rebels men's basketball team represented the University of Mississippi in the 2016–17 NCAA Division I men's basketball season. Andy Kennedy was in his 11th year as head coach of Ole Miss. The Rebels were members of the Southeastern Conference and played their home games at The Pavilion at Ole Miss. They finished the season 22–14, 10–8 in SEC play to finish in a three-way tie for fifth place. They defeated Missouri in the second round of the SEC tournament before losing in the quarterfinals to Arkansas. They were invited to the National Invitation Tournament where they defeated Monmouth and Syracuse before losing in the quarterfinals to Georgia Tech.

Previous season
The Rebels finished the season 20–12, 10–8 in SEC play to finish in a tie for sixth place. They lost to Alabama in the second round of the SEC tournament. Despite having 20 wins, they did not participate in a postseason tournament.

Departures

Incoming transfers

Recruits

Recruiting class of 2017

Roster

Schedule and results

|-
!colspan=9 style="background:#; color:white;"| Exhibition

|-
!colspan=9 style="background:#; color:white;"| Regular season

|-
!colspan=9 style="background:#; color:white;"| SEC tournament

|-
!colspan=9 style="background:#; color:white;"| NIT

See also
2016–17 Ole Miss Rebels women's basketball team

References

Ole Miss
Ole Miss
Ole Miss Rebels men's basketball seasons
Ole Miss Rebels basketball
Ole Miss Rebels